Shahid Mahmood (Urdu: شاہد محمود) (17 March 1939 – 13 December 2020) was a Pakistani cricketer who played in one Test in 1962.

He played first-class cricket in Pakistan from 1957 to 1969. He played his only Test on the tour to England in 1962. In his last season, 1969–70, he became the first Pakistani bowler to take all ten wickets in a first-class innings.

I.A. Khan was his maternal uncle.

After retirement from cricket, he settled in the United States and died in New Jersey on 13 December 2020.

References

External links
 Shahid Mahmood at Cricinfo
 Shahid Mahmood at CricketArchive
 Shahid Mahmood, first Pakistani player to take ten wickets in an innings, dies aged 81 
ESPN Shahid Mahmood, first Pakistani player to take ten wickets in an innings, dies aged 81
 Ex-Test cricketer Shahid Mahmood passes awayDawn News Ex-Test cricketer Shahid Mahmood passes away
 Shahid Mahmood - Home Page Shahid Mahmood Website 
 Opinion A Builder Departs Pakistan Link

1939 births
2020 deaths
Pakistan Test cricketers
Pakistani cricketers
Karachi cricketers
Karachi A cricketers
Karachi Whites cricketers
Karachi Blues cricketers
Karachi B cricketers
Karachi University cricketers
Pakistan Universities cricketers
Public Works Department cricketers
Cricketers who have taken ten wickets in an innings
Cricketers from Lucknow
Pakistani emigrants to the United States